A children's book series is a set of fiction books, with a connected story line, written for children.

See also
Children's literature
List of children's classic books
List of children's literature authors

References

External links
 AuthorAlerts.com
 FantasticFiction.com
 FictFact.com
 FictionDB.com
 OrderOfBooks.com
 StopYoureKillingMe.com